Storm King is a rural locality in the Southern Downs Region, Queensland, Australia.

Geography 
The west of the locality is mountainous and undeveloped. The east of the locality is flatter, contains the Storm King Dam created by impounding Quart Pot Creek and is used for farming.

History 
The locality was named and bounded on 15 December 2000. The name presumably comes from the Storm King Dam, which takes its name from the Storm King Mining Company which was established by John Yaldwyn and James Ross, who built an earlier dam for mining purposes. The company, in turn, took its name from the sailing ship Storm King, on which they migrated to Australia, arriving 9 February 1872.

References 

Southern Downs Region
Localities in Queensland